The 2017 season was Perak The Bos Gaurus Football Club's 14th consecutive season in Malaysia Super League. The team is competing in Malaysia Super League, the Malaysia FA Cup, and the Malaysia Cup.

The season is Mehmet Duraković's first in charge of the club.

Squad information

First-team squad

Appearances contain league matches only
Players name in bold indicates the player is registered during the mid-season transfer window, while players name in italic indicates the player is de-registered or loaned out during the mid-season transfer window.

Coaching staff

Management team

Club personnel
Under new management, the Presidency was taken over by the Secretary General State of Perak, Yang Berhormat Dato' Seri Abdul Puhat Mat Nayan on 4 October 2015.

Pre-season and friendlies

Pre-season

Friendlies

Competitions

Overview

{| class="wikitable" style="text-align: center"
|-
!style="background:Yellow; color:Black;" rowspan=2|Competition
!style="background:Yellow; color:Black;" colspan=8|Record
!style="background:Yellow; color:Black;" rowspan=2|Started round
!style="background:Yellow; color:Black;" rowspan=2|Current position / round
!style="background:Yellow; color:Black;" rowspan=2|Final position / round
!style="background:Yellow; color:Black;" rowspan=2|First match	
!style="background:Yellow; color:Black;" rowspan=2|Last match
|-
!style="background:Yellow; color:Black;"|
!style="background:Yellow; color:Black;"|
!style="background:Yellow; color:Black;"|
!style="background:Yellow; color:Black;"|
!style="background:Yellow; color:Black;"|
!style="background:Yellow; color:Black;"|
!style="background:Yellow; color:Black;"|
!style="background:Yellow; color:Black;"|
|-
| Super League

| —
|  Finished
| 5th
| 21 January 2017
| 28 October 2017
|-
| Malaysia FA Cup

| Round of 32
| —
| Round of 16
| 15 February 2017
| 11 March 2017
|-
| Malaysia Cup

| Group stage
| —
| Semi-finals
| 4 July 2017
| 22 October 2017
|-
! Total

Malaysia Super League

League table

Results by round

Matches 

First round 

Second round

Malaysia FA Cup

Knockout stage

Piala Malaysia

Group stage

Knockout stage

Statistics

Appearances

Goalscorers 
The list is sorted by shirt number when total goals are equal.

Clean sheets
The list is sorted by shirt number when total clean sheets are equal.

Summary

Home attendance
All matches, except MSL Matchday 17 (Shah Alam Stadium) played at Perak Stadium.

Transfers

In

Out

Loans out

References

Perak F.C. seasons
Malaysian football clubs 2017 season